Chopda is a city and municipal council in the Jalgaon district in the state of Maharashtra, India.

Geography
Chopda is a town and one of the Tehsils constituting 111 villages in the Jalgaon district in Maharashtra, a state in the western region of India. The town is situated on the banks of the Ratnavati River and is linked by roads to the rest of the Jalgaon district also borders with Districts like Dhule (Maharashtra), Khargone and Barwani in Madhya Pradesh. The Tapi, one of the major rivers in India, is approximately 10 km away from Chopda.

History 
Chopda city is an old city in the district of Jalgaon. Chopda was controlled by a Powerful Bhil chief.

Demographics
Chopda has a population of 271,863 people.  Males constitute 52 percent of the population and females 48 percent. The average literacy rate is 67 percent, higher than the national average of 59.5 percent, with male literacy at 74 percent and female literacy at 59 percent. Approximately 13 percent of the population is less than six years old.

 

The main languages and dialects spoken are Ahirani, Gujari, Marathi, Hindi, Urdu and English.

Economy

Chopda has an agricultural economy. Major crops include sugar cane, cotton, bananas, pulses, and poultry. Chopda is also home to several industrial projects, including the Chahardi sugar factory, SutGirani, and several cotton ginning and pressing factories. Other businesses like gold and cloth markets can be found on MG Road. Chopda also has several educational institutions and serves as a regional transportation center.

Transportation

Chopda is connected by roads to neighboring cities such as Jalgaon (60 km), Amalner (36 km), Yawal (45 km), Shirpur (45 km). State Highway No.4, Burhanpur-Ankleshwar, goes through Chopda. Railway stations are in the neighbouring cities of Dharangaon, Amalner, Jalgaon, and Bhusawal. The closest airport is at Jalgaon.

Education

Chopda's schools include Pratap Vidya Mandir, Balmohan Vidyalay, Pankaj Primary School, Kasturba, Clara School, Mahila Mandal Madhyamik Vidyalaya, Vivekananda Vidyalaya, Pankaj Global School, Madhyamik Kanya Vidyalaya, College include Arts, Science and Commerce College, Chopda, College of Pharmacy, Smt. S.S.Patil Polytechnic, Pankaj Mahavidyalaya, and PVM B.Ed. College Mustafa Anglo Urdu High School. Pratap Vidya Mandir High School recently marked its centenary of establishment on 9 January 2018. Various other academic institutes and private coaching classes are run in the city. Institutes like Amar Sanstha provide coaching in various fields.

1*. Mahatma Gandhi Shikshak Prasarak Mandal.

Tourism

Local tourist sites include the hot springs at Unapdev. According to local mythology, an arrow shot by Lord Rama formed the hot springs; it is therefore considered a holy place and said to cure skin diseases. There are picnic spots around Unapdev. Other attractions include Chaugaon fort (or Gavali fort) near Lasur, Nageshwar temple, scenic hills in Satpuda, and the river Tapti. Rel Maruti Mandir is a temple dedicated to Lord Hanuman, 8 km from Chopda on the route to Dharangaon. Aner Dam, 20 km from the city, is an old dam on the river Aner. There is also a temple of Sri Sant Shravan Baba On the banks of river Tapi at Vitner, 35 km from Chapda.

Temples and mosque

Chopda has temples and mosque such as Hanuman Mandir at Shivaji Chowk, Mujumdar Ganapati, Hareshwar Mandir, Ram Mandir, Jabare Ram Mandir, Shani Mandir, Shri Krishna Mandir, Bhavani Mandir, Shree sant shravan baba temple vitner, Hazrat mustafa aabad chisti dargha at azad chowk, Hazrat khairotdin muzzarat nakshebandiya, Hazrat kamalotdin baba at shirpur bypass way, Hazrat tatar shah didar shah baba at yawal road and more.

Municipal council

Presidents of the Municipal council

Notable politicians

Members of Legislative Assembly
Sharchchandrika Suresh Patil (Indian National Congress) 1981–1982
Arun Gujarathi (Samajwadi Congress) 1985–1990
Arunbhai Gujrathi (INC) 1989-1994
Arunbhai Gujarathi (INC) 1994–1999
Arun Gujarathi (NCP) 1999–2004 (Speaker of Maharashtra Legislative Assembly)
Kailas gorakh patil (shivsena) 2004-2009
Jagdish Valvi (NCP) 2009–2014
Chandrakant Baliram Sonawane (Shiv Sena) 2014-2019
Latabai Sonawane (shivsena) 2019-Current

Members of Parliament
Sonusing Dhansing Patil (BLD)
Vijay Naval Patil (INC(I)) 1980–1984
Vijay Naval Patil (INC) 1984–1989
Uttam Laxmanrao Patil (BJP) 1989–1991
Vijay Naval Patil (INC) 1991–1996
Annasaheb M.K. Patil (BJP) 1996–1998
Annasaheb M.K. Patil (BJP) 1998–1999
Annasaheb M.K. Patil (BJP) 1999–2003
Annasaheb M.K. Patil (BJP) 2003–2007
Vasantaray Jeevanarav More (National Congress Party) 2007–2009
Haribhau Javle (BJP) 2009–2014
Rakshatai Khadse (BJP) 2014-current

References

External links
Chopda Municipal Council Website
Chopda City Population
Chopda Education Society's B.Ed. College
Mahatma Gandhi Shikshan Mandal's Smt. Sharadchandrika Suresh Patil College of Pharmacy Chopda
Mahatma Gandhi Shikshan Mandal's Art, Science & Commerce College, Chopda.
Manudevi Temple
The Chopda Peoples Co.op. Bank Ltd.

Cities and towns in Jalgaon district
Talukas in Maharashtra